Pukar means a "cry for help or attention" or "to call out" in Hindi and Urdu and may refer to:

 Pukar (1939 film), a Hindi film by Sohrab Modi
 Pukar (1983 film), a Hindi film by Ramesh Behl
 Pukar (1984 film), a Pakistan film by Aizaz Syed and starring Sultan Rahi
 Pukar (2000 film), a Hindi film by Rajkumar Santoshi

See also
 Pukaar (disambiguation)
 Pukara (disambiguation)